Matheny is a census-designated place (CDP) in Wyoming County, West Virginia, United States. As of the 2010 census, its population was 531.  The Laurel Fork flows through the community.

References

Census-designated places in West Virginia
Census-designated places in Wyoming County, West Virginia